The Baiyun Temple is a Buddhist temple located in Taihuai Town of Wutai County, Xinzhou, Shanxi, China. Baiyun Temple was originally built in the Tang dynasty (618-907), but because of war and natural disasters and wars has been rebuilt numerous times since then. The present version was completed in 2005.

History
Baiyun Temple was first established in the Tang dynasty (618-907) by a Buddhism believer from Taiyuan, Shanxi. According to the earliest literature records, "Jinding Temple in Mount Jiuhua in the southern China, and Baiyun Temple in Mount Wutai in northern China".

In the Song dynasty (960-1279), Chan master Daofeng served as abbot of Baiyun Temple, Bishan Temple, Jindeng Temple and Lianjin Temple. The temple had reached unprecedented heyday in that time.

In the reign of the Kangxi Emperor (1654-1722), he worshiped Baiyun Temple and wrote a poem Baiyun Temple. Later in 1748 in the reign of the Qianlong Emperor (1711-1799), a fire devastated two thirds of its buildings. 

In the Second Sino-Japanese War and Cultural Revolution, Baiyun Temple was completely destroyed by the invaders and mobs.

In 1995, master Changlong rebuilt Baiyun Temple. The Lotus Throne of Guanyin, Hall of Four Heavenly Kings, Mahavira Hall, Jieyin Hall, Bell tower, Drum tower, Hall of Kshitigarbha, Hall of Bhaisajyaguru, Hall of Guru, and Wuguan Hall were restored from 1995 to 2005.

Gallery

References

Buddhist temples in Xinzhou
Wutai County
Xinzhou
2005 establishments in China